Hazell Dean ( Poole; born 27 October 1952) is an English dance-pop singer, who achieved her biggest success in the 1980s as a leading Hi-NRG artist. She is best known for the top-ten hits in the United Kingdom "Searchin' (I Gotta Find a Man)", "Whatever I Do (Wherever I Go)" and "Who's Leaving Who". She has also worked as a songwriter and producer.

Career 
Dean was born in Great Baddow, Essex. She started her career in the mid-1970s and came to prominence in the following decade after many years as a club performer and working on the gay scene with her brand of Hi-NRG. She was elected three times as the "Best Live Performer" by the "Federation of American Dance Clubs" (US), and twice as a "Best British Performer" by "Club Mirror Awards" (UK)..

Dean started her career signed to Decca Records releasing a few pop/soul singles from the mid to late 70's written and produced by Paul Curtis. Dean participated in the A Song for Europe contest in 1976, and took eighth place (out of twelve) with the ballad, "I Couldn't Live Without You for a Day", written by contest veteran Curtis.

Dean's first album was first released in 1981. The Sound Of Bacharach and David was a collection of covers written by Burt Bacharach and Hal David and was only released promotionally to radio stations for them to use the songs to pad out their programming with songs they didn't have to pay so much for in royalties. A very rare album, it was re-released commercially for the first time in 2014. Dean also released a promotional double A side single for the area of Medway (Medway You're The One / Medway That's Where I Wanna Be) in 1982.  This was re-discovered and put onto YouTube in 2017.

Mainstream success 
Dean decided to put behind her pop/soul sound she had been recording, and issued her first dance record, "Searchin' (I Gotta Find a Man)" in the summer of 1983. While it was a big hit in gay clubs, it only peaked at #76.

In February 1984 she entered the UK Singles Chart with the double A-sided single, "Evergreen" / "Jealous Love" which peaked at #63. In April 1984 Dean participated in "A Song For Europe" again, finish in seventh place out of eight, with another dramatic ballad, "Stay In My Life", which she wrote herself.

In June 1984, the re-release of "Searchin' (I Gotta Find A Man)" became her first single to reach the UK top 10, peaking at #6.  Despite the success of the single, Dean says there was no follow up in place even as it rose high in the charts, and when she accidentally ran into producer Pete Waterman at Proto Records, she agreed to consider working with his then little known team, Stock Aitken Waterman (SAW).

Producer Mike Stock recalled the pressure on Dean to produce a follow up when she came to SAW in the hope of a second hit. "She was upset at time," Stock remembered. "I remember her saying at times this was so important to her. [It was] that dreadful follow up situation – how do you follow up a hit?'"

Dean then released the follow-up, "Whatever I Do (Wherever I Go)" (produced by SAW), in July which peaked at #4. "Whatever I Do" was originally named "Dance Your Love Away", and had been recorded by singer Michael Prince, but the song was re-written by Mike Stock and Matt Aitken because Dean disliked the chorus.

Prince says he was not informed that Dean had recorded a version of the song he'd recorded months earlier and was waiting to release. He claimed he first found out when her version came on while he was dancing in a nightclub. A new version of "Dance Your Love Away" was released as a single in 1985, but did not chart.

In contrast, Dean's placing with the song gave Stock/Aitken/Waterman their first top 10 hit. Further singles, "Back In My Arms (Once Again)" and "No Fool (For Love)" both peaked at #41. These singles were included on her debut mainstream pop album, Heart First, which did not sell well and failed to chart.

In 1985 the single Harmony (written by Bill Clift and Peter Marsh) was released in Germany on the Bellaphon label. In 1985 Dean signed with label EMI Records, releasing the Stock/Aitken/Waterman-produced single "They Say It's Gonna Rain", which included lyrics in Zulu and reached #58 on the UK Singles Chart, and became a #1 single in South Africa. Subsequent singles fared worse with "ESP", "Stand Up" and "Always (Doesn't Mean Forever)" failing to reach the UK top 75. In early 1988 however, she achieved her biggest hit in four years with "Who's Leaving Who", which reached #4. The track, a cover of an Anne Murray song, restored her commercial fortunes and led to a new album. 

The follow-up singles, "Maybe (We Should Call it a Day)" and "Turn It into Love" (also recorded by Kylie Minogue and included on her debut album, Kylie) peaked at #15 and #21 respectively. Dean has expressed her regret over the release order of the two tracks, feeling that her comeback trajectory as a Top 40 act was blunted as a result. Contrary to widely reported claims at the time, Dean denies she asked to record "Turn It Into Love" after hearing Kylie's version in the studio, and insists she thought she was recording a brand new track, only to find out about Kylie's version after its release. Dean admitted she was "p-ed off" when she discovered there had been a double up, calling the reuse of the song by SAW "a cop out".

Her second album, Always, was released in October 1988 and featured many of the singles from the previous 3 years, as well as new material. The album charted at #38 in the UK.

1990s 
Dean left EMI and signed with Lisson Records, releasing two singles for the label. The first was a cover of Yvonne Elliman's "Love Pains" in 1989, produced by PWL producers Phil Harding and Ian Curnow. It reached #48 on the UK Singles Chart. More than 18 months elapsed before Dean's next single was released, the Stock/Aitken/Waterman penned and produced "Better Off Without You", originally recorded by Lonnie Gordon. It was her final UK top 75 chart entry, peaking at #72. After the failure of these two singles, Dean ceased working with Stock/Aitken/Waterman and began working with Ian Levine, who had previously remixed and produced tracks with her in the mid 1980s. 

During this time, Dean produced and wrote songs for Bad Boys Inc, Bona Riah (produced "House of Rising Sun"), Miquel Brown (produced "It's a Sin"), MEN 2 B (co-wrote "Love Satisfaction"), Upside Down and Sandra Feva.

1996 saw the release of Dean's next album, The Winner Takes It All, which was released on Carlton Records. This album contained covers of ABBA songs. The title track was released as a single. In 1999, Dean released a cover version of Bon Jovi's "Living On A Prayer" and, in 2001, a remixed version of "Who's Leaving Who" was released. Neither of these singles charted.

Recent career 

In 2007, Dean returned to record with Ian Levine, completing the track "Trade Him for a Newer Model" for the album Disco 2008. The music video for Trade Him for a Newer Model was released on YouTube by Levine in 2007.

In 2009, several songs that had not been released on any Dean album their original form were released on iTunes, including some previously unreleased remixes.  Cherry Red Records re-issued Dean's first mainstream pop album, Heart First, in early 2010.

2010 saw Hazell Dean sign to the dance label, Energise Records. Dean recorded an updated version of her 1985 single, "They Say It's Gonna Rain". "Shattered Glass", "In The Name Of Love", "This Is My Life", "We Belong/Can You Feel It" and "I Close My Eyes & Count To Ten" were released as singles from her 2013 album, "In The Name Of...".

Cherry Red Records released a Deluxe Edition of Always on 23 April 2012. On 10 September 2012, a 21 track greatest hits collection, Evergreen: The Very Best of Hazell Dean, was released through Music Club Deluxe Records.  The CD pressing features a bonus disc of 11 remixes and rare extended mixes of Dean's 1980s hits. On 21 December 2012, Dean performed at the Stock/Aitken/Waterman "Hit Factory Live" reunion concert at London's O2 Arena, along with many other former Stock/Aitken/Waterman acts.

In 2013, Dean released the album In the Name of..., through Energise records. 2015 saw her release the singles "24 Hours" and "Nightlife", again with Energise, both taken from the album Nightlife released the same year. 2016 saw the release of two EPs through Energise records – "Evergreen/Judgement Day" and "Happy New Year/ The Way Old Friends Do" She continues to perform live and occasionally records with various producers, with tracks appearing via her official website.

In August 2021, Dean announced her retirement from live performing, with her last live show being on 18 September at Lets Rock Leeds and Wentworth Festival, and a release of a new compilation, The Dean and Ware Collection Vol. 1 on the 24th.

Hazell is proud to continue in her role as Patron of Pride in Surrey.

Gay following 
After the success of "Searchin'", Dean made her LGBT club debut at Heaven in London and has subsequently enjoyed a large LGBT following. Acknowledging the support she has received from the LGBT community throughout her career, Dean frequently performs at LGBT Pride events both in the UK and abroad. On 29 August 2021, after 38 years, Dean played her last Pride performance in Hastings, where she also announced her retirement from live shows.

Dean is Patron of Pride in Surrey.

She is in the Pride Power List – which celebrates the 100 most influential LGBT people in the UK.

Dean is a Trans Ally and supporter of Transgender Rights.

Personal life 
Dean has a sister and an older brother who still live in their birthplace in Essex.

Hazell Dean has been in a long-term relationship since 1991 and has been in a civil partnership since 2005.

Her daughter was born in December 2004.

Discography

Albums

Singles

References

External links 
HazellDean.net – official website
EuroDanceHits.com – info page

1952 births
Living people
English dance musicians
English record producers
English women singer-songwriters
Eurodance musicians
Lesbian singers
Lesbian songwriters
LGBT record producers
British hi-NRG musicians
English lesbian musicians
English LGBT singers
English LGBT songwriters
English women pop singers
British women record producers
20th-century English LGBT people
21st-century English LGBT people